Richard Wilson Riley (born January 2, 1933) is an American politician, the United States Secretary of Education under President Bill Clinton and the 111th governor of South Carolina. He is a member of the Democratic Party. Riley is the only Democrat to serve two consecutive terms as governor in the time since the state constitution was amended to allow governors to serve consecutive terms.

Early life and career
Richard Riley was born on January 2, 1933, in Greenville, South Carolina, to Edward P. "Ted" Riley and the former Martha (née Dixon) Riley. He graduated cum laude from Furman University, where he was a member of the South Carolina Phi Chapter of Sigma Alpha Epsilon, in 1954 and received his law degree from the University of South Carolina.

Riley served in the South Carolina House of Representatives from 1963 to 1966. He served in the South Carolina Senate from 1967 to 1977.

Governor of South Carolina, 1979–1987 

Riley was elected governor of South Carolina in 1978. During his first term, the state constitution was amended to allow governors to serve two terms. Riley was re-elected in 1982, 69-31 percent, over the Republican former journalist W. D. Workman, Jr., of Greenville, and served until 1987.

As governor, Riley presided over the resumption of executions, despite his personal opposition to the death penalty.

As Governor of South Carolina, he initiated the Education Improvement Act, which a Rand Corp. study at the time called “the most comprehensive educational reform measure in the U.S.” He also initiated landmark legislation such as the Medically Indigent Assistance Act, the first statewide program of its kind in the nation; the Employment Revitalization Act aimed at coordinating occupational training statewide; and the Omnibus Crime Bill, which strengthened punishments for violent crimes while dealing responsibly with prison overcrowding.

Post-gubernatorial career 

In 1993, President Bill Clinton approached Riley about an appointment to the United States Supreme Court, which Riley turned down. Clinton ultimately appointed Ruth Bader Ginsburg. That same year, President Clinton appointed Riley to his Cabinet as Secretary of Education. From 1997 to 2000, Riley worked with senior adviser Carol Rasco, the director of Clinton's childhood literacy initiative, the America Reads Challenge, to design and implement the program. Riley served as Secretary of Education until Clinton left office in 2001. Since then, he has served as a partner in the law firm of Nelson Mullins Riley & Scarborough, LLP, and served as a board member of the Albert Shanker Institute. On June 27, 2007, he endorsed Hillary Clinton for president and served as a campaign co-chair.

World Justice Project
Riley serves as an Honorary Co-Chair for the World Justice Project. The World Justice Project works to lead a global, multidisciplinary effort to strengthen the Rule of Law for the development of communities of opportunity and equity.

Recognitions 
In 1999, Furman University, Riley's alma mater, created the Richard W. Riley Institute of Government, Politics and Public Leadership in his honor. In 2000, Riley received the Foreign Language Advocacy Award from the Northeast Conference on the Teaching of Foreign Languages in recognition of his support for education and especially for his repeated recommendations that all students learn a second language. In 2008, Walden University renamed its college of education the Richard W. Riley College of Education and Leadership, in honor of Riley's "commitment to students, his legacy of improving access to higher education, and his focus on diversity in education." Winthrop University also renamed its college of education after Riley in 2000.

TIME magazine in 2008 named him among the Top Ten Best Cabinet Members in USA history. The Christian Science Monitor once said that many Americans regard Dick Riley as "one of the great statesmen of education in this (20th) century." The late David Broder, columnist for The Washington Post, called him one of the "most decent and honorable people in public life."

In 2018, his hometown of Greenville announced plans to memorialize him with a sculpture representing his extraordinary public leadership and commitment to quality education for all children.

The Richard W. Riley Collection opened in 2018 at the University of South Carolina’s South Carolina Political Collections and contains more than 3,000 photographs; thousands of speeches with Riley’s handwritten edits; extensive research notes on policy development; considerable correspondence and news clippings; interviews with Riley and his late wife, Tunky, their son, Ted, and Dick Riley's father, Edward P. “Ted” Riley. The collection also includes printed campaign materials from Riley's political campaigns and his efforts for others, including Clinton, Jimmy Carter, and Al Gore.

Personal life
Riley and his wife, the late Ann O. Yarborough, have three sons and one daughter.

See also
Bill Clinton Supreme Court candidates

References
Specific

General
 U.S. Department of Education Bio
 The Political Graveyard
 CNN AllPolitics – Players – Richard Riley
 Nelson, Mullins, Riley, and Scarborough Biography
 Richard W. Riley College of Education and Leadership 
 The Riley Institute
 Furman University

External links
 SCIway Biography of Richard Wilson Riley
 NGA Biography of Richard Wilson Riley
 Past Winners of Harold W. McGraw, Jr. Prize in Education
 Richard Riley Interview NAMM Oral History Program (2013)
 
Richard W. Riley Papers at South Carolina Political Collections, University of South Carolina
Governor Richard Riley Papers at the South Carolina Department of Archives & History
1979 Richard Riley Swearing in ceremony and Inaugural Ball on South Carolina Educational Television
1983 Richard Riley Swearing in ceremony and Inaugural Ball on South Carolina Educational Television

|-

|-

|-

|-

|-

|-

1933 births
20th-century American politicians
Methodists from South Carolina
Clinton administration cabinet members
Democratic Party governors of South Carolina
Furman University alumni
Living people
Democratic Party members of the South Carolina House of Representatives
People from Greenville, South Carolina
Democratic Party South Carolina state senators
United States Secretaries of Education
University of South Carolina alumni
University of South Carolina trustees